Lewis is a masculine English-language given name. It was coined as an anglicisation of given names in other languages.

"Lewis" has been used to anglicise the Irish name "", the German name "", and the French name "" (the last two originally deriving from the Old Frankish name ). It may also be a borrowing from the Isle of Lewis in the Outer Hebrides, whose name derives from the Scottish Gaelic .

Variant forms
 
 
 
 Ancient Germanic: Chlodovech, Clodovicus, Ludovicus, Clovis, Hludowig
  (Loudovik)
 
 
 
 
 
 Chinese (traditional and simplified):  (Lùyì)
 
 
 
 
 
 
 
 
 
 
 
 Hindi:      
 
 
 
 
 
 Japanese:  (Rui)
 Korean: , 
 
 
 
 Medieval Occitan: Aloys, Aloysius
 
 Occitan: 
 Persian: 
 
 
 Provençal: 
 Punjabi: ਲੂਯਿਸ (Lūyis)
 
 
 Scottish Gaelic: 
 Sicilian: Luiggi, Ludovicu
  (Luj), Људевит (Ljudevit)
 , Alojz
 , Alojzij, Ludvik
 , Ludovico
 , Ludde
 Tamil: லூயிஸ் (Lūyis)
 Telugu: లూయిస్ (Lūyis)
 Thai: หลุยส์ (H̄luys̄̒)
  (Lyudovyk)
 Welsh: Lewis, Lewys

List of people with the given name Lewis

Nobility
 Lewis Hugh Clifford, 9th Baron Clifford of Chudleigh, British peer
 Lewis Joseph Hugh Clifford, 12th Baron Clifford of Chudleigh, British peer
 Lewis Hugh Clifford, 13th Baron Clifford of Chudleigh, British peer
 Lewis Grant-Ogilvy, 5th Earl of Seafield, Scottish peer and Member of Parliament
 Lewis Gordon, 3rd Marquess of Huntly (c. 1626–1653), Scottish nobleman
 Lewis Mordaunt, 3rd Baron Mordaunt, British politician and peer
 Lewis Robessart, British baron
 Lewis Watson, 1st Baron Sondes, British politician and peer
 Lewis Watson, 2nd Baron Sondes, British politician and peer
 Lewis Watson, 3rd Baron Sondes, British peer

Politics
 Lewis V. Bogy (1813–1877), American politician and senator from Missouri
 Lewis Burwell, several men by the name from the Burwell family of Virginia
 Lewis Cass, American politician and senator from Michigan
 Lewis Stuyvesant Chanler, American politician and lieutenant governor of New York
 Lewis Preston Collins II (1896–1952), lieutenant governor of Virginia
 Lewis Weston Dillwyn, British porcelain manufacturer, naturalist and Member of Parliament (MP)
 Lewis E. Eliason, American politician and Lieutenant Governor of Delaware
 Lewis Wormser Harris (1812–1876), bill-broker, financier and the first Jew elected Lord Mayor of Dublin
 Lewis Jones (politician) (1884–1968), British politician, MP for Swansea West, 1931–1945
 G. Lewis Jones (1907–1971), Assistant Secretary of State for Near Eastern and South Asian Affairs, 1959–1961
 Lewis Charles Levin (1808-1860), U.S. Congressman from Pennsylvania
 Lewis F. Linn, American politician and senator from Missouri 
 Lewis Morris, signer of the American Declaration of Independence
 Lewis Morris (governor), American colonial leader in New York and New Jersey
 Lewis Morris (speaker), American judge, politician and landowner
 Lewis R. Morris, U.S. Representative from Vermont
 Sir Lewis Morris (1833–1907), Welsh poet, academic and politician
 Lewis E. Parsons, American politician and governor of Alabama
 Lewis E. Reed, American politician
 Lewis B. Schwellenbach, American politician and senator

Arts and entertainment
 Lewis Grandison Alexander (1898-1945), American poet, actor, and playwright with ties to the Harlem Renaissance
 Lewis Black (born 1948), American comedian and actor
 Lewis Brindley, British comedian and YouTuber
 Lewis Capaldi (born 1996), Scottish singer-songwriter
 Lewis Carroll (1832–1898), pen name of Charles Lutwidge Dodgson, the author of Alice in Wonderland
 Lewis Casson (1875–1969), English actor and theatre director
 Lewis Collins (1946–2013), English film and theatre actor
 Lewis D. Collins (1899–1954), American film director
 Lewis Hartsough (1828–1919), American Methodist evangelist and gospel songwriter/composer
 Lewis Hobba (born 1985), Australian radio presenter, television presenter and comedian
 Lewis Jones (1897–1939), Welsh writer and political activist
 Lewis Lovhaug, comic reviewer also known as Linkara
 Lewis Morris (1701–1765), Welsh hydrographer, antiquary, poet and lexicographer
 Lewis Nash (born 1958), American jazz drummer
 Lewis H. Nash (1852–1923), an American engineer and inventor of the liquid-ring-vacuum pump
 Lewis "Lou" Reed (1942–2013), American rock musician and member of the Velvet Underground
 Lewis E. Reed (born 1962), American politician
 Lewis Shiner (born 1950), American author
 Lewis Waller (1860–1915), English actor and theatre manager
 Lewis Watson (born 1992), British singer-songwriter
 Lewis Strange Wingfield (1842–1891), Irish traveller, actor, writer, and painter
 Lewys Glyn Cothi / Lewis Glyn Cothi (c. 1420–1490), 15th century Welsh poet

Sports
 Lewis Bradley (rugby) (1889–1918), English rugby union and rugby league footballer who played in the 1900s and 1910s
 Lewis Brown (rugby league), New Zealand rugby league player
 Lewis Burton, British tennis player and model
 Lewis Collins (footballer), Welsh footballer
 Lewis Dark, footballer
 Lewis Hamilton, Formula One racing driver
 Lewis Hamilton (footballer), footballer
 Lewis Harris (rugby league), English rugby league player
 Lewis Holtby, German footballer
 Lewis Jones (Australian footballer) (1883–1960), Australian rules footballer
 Lewis Jones (footballer, born 1994), British footballer
 Lewis Jones (rugby) (born 1931), Welsh rugby union, and rugby league footballer of the 1940s, 1950s and 1960s
 Lewis Jones (rugby player born 1992), Welsh rugby union scrum-half
 Lewis Kidd (American football) (born 1997), American football player
 Lewis Moody, English Rugby Union player
 Lewis Pugh, British-South African extreme swimmer, international environmental activist
 Lewis Smith (footballer), Scottish footballer
 Lewis Williamson, racing driver
 Lewis Young, footballer

Religion
 Lewis Bagot, English Bishop of Bristol, Norwich
 Lewis Jones (bishop) (1542–1646), Bishop of Killaloe
 Lewis Bevel Jones III (1926–2018), bishop of the United Methodist Church
 Lewis B. Paton (1864-1932), American biblical scholar

Science
 Lewis Roberts Binford, American archaeologist
 Lewis Boss, American astronomer
 Lewis J. Feldman, American professor
 Lewis Hine, American sociologist and photographer
 Lewis G. Longsworth (1904–1981), American biochemist and professor at Rockefeller University
 Lewis Ralph Jones (1864–1945), American botanist and agricultural biologist
 Lewis Wade Jones (1910–1979), sociologist and educator
 Lewis Webster Jones (1899–1975), American economist
 Lewis A. Swift, American astronomer

Business
 Lewis Ginter, American businessman and philanthropist
 Lewis Harris (philanthropist) (1900–1983), New Zealand farmer, stock dealer and philanthropist
 Lewis Gouverneur Morris, banker and social figure in New York and Newport society

Military
 Lewis Addison Armistead, American general in the American Civil War 
 Lewis H. Brereton, military aviation pioneer and lieutenant general in the United States Air Force
 Lewis Collins (RAF officer) (1894–1971), British First World War flying ace
 Lewis Jones (Royal Navy officer) (1797–1895)
 Lewis Nicola, American military officer notable for authoring the Newburgh letter
 Lewis Sayre Van Duzer, US Navy officer

Other
 Lewis Archer Boswell, American aviator
 Lewis de Claremont, pseudonym of an American author on occultism who flourished during the 1930s
 Lewis Jones (Patagonia) (1836–1904), one of the founders of the Welsh settlement in Patagonia who gave his name to the town of Trelew
 Lewis G. Morris, maritime advocate, sheep and cattle breeder
 Lewis Yancey, American aviator

Pseudonym
 Lewis (musician), Canadian musician

Fictional characters
 Lewis (The Simpsons), a fictional character in The Simpsons
 Lewis Bodine, a character in the 1997 film Titanic
 Lewis Romero, a character in the 2006 film Final Destination 3
 Lewis Skolnik, a character in the Revenge of the Nerds movie series
Lewis "Cornelius" Robinson, a character in the 2007 film Meet the Robinsons
 Lewis Zimmerman, Star Trek character
Lewis (Holes), A fictional character in Holes by Louis Sachar

See also
 Aloysius
 Clovis (given name)
 Lewis (disambiguation)
 Louis (given name)
 Lugh
 Louise (given name)
 Ludwig (given name)
 Luigi (name)
 Luis

References

English masculine given names
Scottish masculine given names